

Introduction
The realism is derived from real word. This school emerged in the nineteenth century. The realism is based on realism and the subject was made in contemporary society. The emergence factors of This school include :

1. The not-so-famous writers and artists who lived in the Latin Quarter of Paris and made a mock of romantics.

2. Barbizon School painters of the Italian classical tradition that was common at that time, Considered obsolete. And called for direct observation of nature. And reacted against the romantices reality escape.

The realism elementary

This type of realism begins with the works of Balzac. Elementary realism is committed itself to renewal accurate, complete and honestly social environment and the contemporary world, But this renewal is very simple and a pattern is not offered. In addition, Elementary realism is pessimistic and disappointed about the future. Works that were written in this school include, War and Peace by Tolstoy, Fyodor Dostoyevsky's Crime and Punishment and The Brothers Karamazov . Cape short story written by Nikolai Gogol as a fine example for elementary realism.

References 

 Abdul Hussain Farzad. Iran and world literature 1. Educational books,?.204.1386
 Dyman Grant. Realism. Translated by Hassan Afshar. Center, 1357

Literature